Marek "The Punisher" Piotrowski (born 14 August 1964) is a Polish retired heavyweight kickboxer and boxer.  He is a former ten time kickboxing world champion.

Amateur career
At around the age of 13 or 14, Piotrowski studied jujutsu achieving green belt before becoming interested in Kyokushin karate when he was at age of 18. In 1984 (in under 25 years old class) he won the Polish Juniors karate championship, following this up the next year by winning the Polish Senior championship. He became a karate black belt 1st dan in July 1993. His official karate record is 13 fights, with 13 victories.

At the beginning of 1987, Piotrowski began to focus on kickboxing, in particular, full-contact, which was prohibited in Poland at the time.  On 11 October 1987 he entered the 81  kg category of the 6th W.A.K.O. World Championships, a tournament for amateur kickboxers, held in Munich, Germany. Piotrowski won the competition defeating Hungarian Károly Halász in the final. Later that year he entered and won the Full Contact Kickboxing World Cup '87 in Budapest, Hungary and also won the Polish national kickboxing title. He had several more fights in 1988 in Poland and Europe, amassing a 17-0 amateur kickboxing record.

Professional career
In 1988 Piotrowski decided to leave Poland for the USA where he was determined to become a professional world champion, something he was unable to do in his own country due to the Communist-era rules on professionalism. He had his first professional fight in Rockford, Illinois in October 1988 against Bob Handegan whom he defeated via knockout in the 4th round. On 19 August 1989, in his fifth fight on American soil, Piotrowski sent shockwaves through the kickboxing community by outworking the reigning national champion Rick "The Jet" Roufus in a 10th round unanimous decision win. Piotrowski took Roufus's P.K.C. middleweight U.S belt.

As a result of his upset victory over Roufus, Piotrowski had his world title shot against the legendary Don "The Dragon" Wilson. On 4 November 1989, in Chicago, Illinois he defeated Wilson and took his belts, becoming the world champion of the  P.K.C. and F.F.K.A kickboxing organizations, while Wilson had to vacate his I.S.K.A. world title due to the loss (which Marek did not gain due to it not being an I.S.K.A. sanctioned event). As a result of his victories over two world class fighters, Piotrowski earned the nickname "The Punisher".

Throughout 1990 and 1991 he fought six more bouts, adding more championships to his collection by defeating Bob 'The Thunder' Thurman to win the K.I.C.K. Intercontinental title in Las Vegas, Nevada and Mark Longo to win the K.I.C.K. in Los Angeles, California. His kickboxing record now stood at 29 wins to 0 defeats (19 coming via knockout) and he held four professional world titles.

On 22 June 1991 in Chicago Piotrowski put his P.K.C. title on the line in a re-match against Rick Roufus while the vacant I.S.K.A. world title was also up for grabs. Piotrowski was not in the best condition for the fight, as ongoing personal problems hampered his preparation and he was defeated, suffering a heavy 2nd-round knockout from a high kick that left him unconscious on the canvas. After suffering his first ever defeat, Piotrowski needed time to recuperate and did not fight for the rest of the year.

In 1992 Piotrowski decided to enter professional boxing, winning his debut against Keith Williams on 8 February by technical knockout in the 4th round. Despite starting his boxing career, Piotrowski still wanted to recover his lost titles and fought several kickboxing bouts, winning all of them. In July 1992 he fought the Canadian Conrad Pla for the I.S.K.A. North American title, defeating him by 10th-round decision. After dismantling another opponent via 3rd round K.O. in Las Vegas, Piotrowski was ready for the opportunity to regain one of his world titles.

In Paris, France on 11 November 1992 the North American I.S.K.A. champion met the W.K.A. Junior Light Heavyweight champion and legendary Dutchman Rob Kaman (also known as 'Mr Low-Kick', 98 wins, 78 K.O.s) for a shot at the I.S.K.A. World title, fought under Oriental Rules (this formula allowing low kicks). Unfortunately for Piotrowski he lost by technical knockout in a very dramatic fight - Kaman's renowned low kicks getting the better of him in the 7th round.

On 22 June 1993 he travelled to Montreal, Canada where he took on future K-1 fighter Michael "The Black Sniper" McDonald. Piotrowski won the fight by technical knockout in the 11th round, winning the W.A.K.O. Pro Full Contact World title, adding the professional W.A.K.O. title to the amateur one he had won back in 1987. Later that year he defeated Mike Winkeljohn by 8th-round decision, finally getting his hands back on the I.S.K.A. (Oriental Rules version) World title belt.

In 1994 Piotrowski won two more titles. In February he defeated Roy McCown to win the little-known T.B.C world title, while on 15 March he defeated Javier Mendez in San Jose, California to win the I.S.K.A. (Full Contact) World title. By the end of the year he was progressively becoming less focused on kickboxing and more on boxing, going 4 and 0.

In December 1995 he returned to Poland for his last kickboxing fight. In Kraków he defeated Italian Stefano Tomiazzo, winning the W.K.A. World title. He finished his kickboxing career with a record of 44 fights, with 42 victories to just 2 defeats and had been an eight-time professional world champion with seven different organizations; W.K.A., I.S.K.A., P.K.C, T.B.C., F.F.K.A, K.I.C.K. and W.A.K.O. pro, as well as holding two amateur world titles.

After retiring from kickboxing Piotrowski continued his boxing career. Between 1992 and 1996, he fought in 21 fights and won all of them. He finished his career on 13 December 1996 in Hannover, Germany, defeating Greg Lavely on points. In 1997 he was offered to fight for a professional championship for the I.B.F. belt, but he had to refuse due to health problems.  Piotrowski returned to live in Poland in 2002.

Titles

Professional
1995 W.K.A. Full Contact Heavyweight World champion
1994 I.S.K.A. Full Contact Light Heavyweight World champion
1994 T.B.C. Full Contact World champion
1993 I.S.K.A. Oriental Rules Light Heavyweight World champion
1993 W.A.K.O. Pro Full-Contact Light Heavyweight World champion
1991 I.S.K.A. Full Contact Light Heavyweight North American champion
1990 K.I.C.K. Light Heavyweight World champion
1990 K.I.C.K. Light Heavyweight Intercontinental champion
1989 P.K.C. Full Contact Light Heavyweight World champion
1989 F.F.K.A. Full Contact Light Heavyweight World champion
1989 P.K.C. Full-Contact Middleweight United States champion

Amateur
1987 Poland Full-Contact Kickboxing champion
1987 Full contact Kickboxing World Cup '87 
1987 W.A.K.O. World Championships in Munich  -81 kg (Full-Contact)
1985 Poland Senior Karate Championship 
1984 Poland Junior Karate Championship

Other recognitions

In 1987 Piotrowski gained 'The Siren' award from the Sportowiec magazine from being the best Polish sport discovery of the year.
On three separate occasions he was placed in the top ten of the best Polish sportsmen of the year in the Przeglad Sportowy ranking (1988, 1989, 1990), twice coming runner up.
The 'Fighter' magazine voted Piotrowski second in their 'Best Kickboxers of the 1980s', -172 pound (78 kg) category.
On two occasions he was recognised by American experts as 'Kickboxer of the Year' (1989 and 1994).
He was also chosen by the American press as one of the best fighters of the 1990s.
In 1991 Aleksander Bilik published the book 'Kickboxer', which described Piotrowski's career up until 1990.
In 2005 a documentary about Piotrowski called 'The Warrior' was filmed.
Also in 2005 there was the comic strip 'the Kickboxer' based on Marek Piotrowski published in the Polish publication Gazeta Wyborcza.
In 2006 Piotrowski received the Stanley Honour - Kickboxing award.

Kickboxing record

|-
|-  bgcolor="#CCFFCC"
| 1995-12-? || Win ||align=left| Steffano Tomiazzo || || Katowice, Poland || Decision || 12 || || 42-2
|-
! style=background:white colspan=9 |
|-
|-  bgcolor="#CCFFCC"
| 1995-05-? || Win ||align=left| William Thompson || || Clearwater, Florida, USA || KO || 2 || || 41-2
|-
|-  bgcolor="#CCFFCC"
| 1994-07-? || Win ||align=left| Cecil Simms || || Chicago, Illinois, USA || KO || 4 || || 40-2
|-
|-  bgcolor="#CCFFCC"
| 1994-04-15 || Win ||align=left| Javier Mendez || || San Jose, California, USA || Decision || 12 || || 39-2
|-
! style=background:white colspan=9 |
|-
|-  bgcolor="#CCFFCC"
| 1994 || Win ||align=left| Gary Jones || || Katowice, Poland || KO || 3 || || 38-2
|-
|-  bgcolor="#CCFFCC"
| 1994-02-? || Win ||align=left| Roy McCown || || Chicago, Illinois, USA || KO || 6 || || 37-2
|-
! style=background:white colspan=9 |
|-
|-  bgcolor="#CCFFCC"
| 1993-11-? || Win ||align=left| Mike Winkeljohn || || Chicago, Illinois, USA || Decision || 8 || 2:00 || 36-2
|-
! style=background:white colspan=9 |
|-
|-  bgcolor="#CCFFCC"
| 1993-06-22 || Win ||align=left| Michael McDonald || P.K.A. Karatemania 6 || Montreal, Canada || TKO || 11 || || 35-2
|-
! style=background:white colspan=9 |
|-
|-  bgcolor="#CCFFCC"
| 1993-04-? || Win ||align=left| Troy Hughes ||  || Chicago, Illinois, USA || Decision || 7 || 2:00 || 34-2
|-
|-  bgcolor="#FFBBBB"
| 1992-11-? || Loss ||align=left| Rob Kaman || || Paris, France || TKO || 7 || || 33-2
|-
! style=background:white colspan=9 |
|-
|-  bgcolor="#CCFFCC"
| 1992-09-? || Win ||align=left| Sergei Parkomienko ||  || Las Vegas, Nevada, USA || KO || 3 || || 33-1
|-
|-  bgcolor="#CCFFCC"
| 1992-07-? || Win ||align=left| Conrad Pla ||  || Chicago, Illinois, USA || Decision || 10 || 2:00 || 32-1
|-
! style=background:white colspan=9 |
|-
|-  bgcolor="#CCFFCC"
| 1992-05-? || Win ||align=left| John Cronk ||  || Detroit, Michigan, USA || KO || 4 || || 31-1
|-
|-  bgcolor="#CCFFCC"
| 1992-04-? || Win ||align=left| Derrell Banks ||  || Chicago, Illinois, USA || KO || 4 || || 30-1
|-
|-  bgcolor="#FFBBBB"
| 1991-06-22 || Loss ||align=left| Rick Roufus ||  || Chicago, Illinois, USA || KO (High Kick) || 2 || || 29-1
|-
! style=background:white colspan=9 |
|-
|-  bgcolor="#CCFFCC"
| 1991-03-? || Win ||align=left| Robert Tooley ||  || Chicago, Illinois, USA || KO || 4 || || 29-0
|-
|-  bgcolor="#CCFFCC"
| 1990-10-? || Win ||align=left| Andy Brewer ||  || Chicago, Illinois, USA || KO || 4 || || 28-0
|-
|-  bgcolor="#CCFFCC"
| 1990-08-? || Win ||align=left| Mark Longo ||  || Lake Tahoe, USA || Decision || 12 || 2:00 || 27-0
|-
! style=background:white colspan=9 |
|-
|-  bgcolor="#CCFFCC"
| 1990-07-05 || Win ||align=left| Tommy Richardson ||  || Las Vegas, Nevada, USA || KO || 4 || || 26-0
|-
|-  bgcolor="#CCFFCC"
| 1990-05-? || Win ||align=left| Jim Maurina ||  || Chicago, Illinois, USA || KO || 4 || || 25-0
|-
|-  bgcolor="#CCFFCC"
| 1990-04-? || Win ||align=left| Bob Thurman ||  || Los Angeles, California, USA || KO || 7 || || 24-0
|-
! style=background:white colspan=9 |
|-
|-  bgcolor="#CCFFCC"
| 1989-11-04 || Win ||align=left| Don Wilson || F.F.K.A. & P.K.C. Event || Chicago, Illinois, USA || Decision (Split) || 12 || 2:00 || 23-0
|-
! style=background:white colspan=9 |
|-
|-  bgcolor="#CCFFCC"
| 1989-08-19 || Win ||align=left| Rick Roufus ||  || Chicago, Illinois, USA || Decision (Unanimous) || 10 || 2:00 || 22-0
|-
! style=background:white colspan=9 |
|-
|-  bgcolor="#CCFFCC"
| 1989-06-? || Win ||align=left| Larry McFadden || || Chicago, Illinois, USA || Decision || 10 || 2:00 || 21-0
|-
|-  bgcolor="#CCFFCC"
| 1989-03-? || Win ||align=left| Lowell Nash || || Chicago, Illinois, USA || TKO || 6 || || 20-0
|-
|-  bgcolor="#CCFFCC"
| 1988-12-? || Win ||align=left| Neil Singleton || || Chicago, Illinois, USA || TKO || 4 || || 19-0
|-
|-  bgcolor="#CCFFCC"
| 1988-10-? || Win ||align=left| Bob Handegan || || Rockford, Illinois, USA || KO || 4 || || 18-0
|-
! style=background:white colspan=9 |
|-
|-  bgcolor="#CCFFCC"
| 1988-06-? || Win ||align=left| Józef Warchoł || || Koszalin, Poland || Decision || 5 || || 17-0
|-
|-  bgcolor="#CCFFCC"
| 1988-06-? || Win ||align=left| Zoltán Németh || || Warsaw, Poland || KO || 1 || || 16-0
|-
|-  bgcolor="#CCFFCC"
| 1988-05-? || Win ||align=left| Zoran Tariba || || Cologne, Germany || KO || 2 || || 15-0
|-
|-  bgcolor="#CCFFCC"
| 1988-04-? || Win ||align=left| Zoltán Németh || || Komló, Hungary || || || || 14-0
|-
|-  bgcolor="#CCFFCC"
| 1988-04-? || Win ||align=left| Stefan Pellegrino || || Komló, Hungary || Decision || || || 13-0
|-
|-  bgcolor="#CCFFCC"
| 1987-12-? || Win ||align=left| Andrzej First || || Kraków, Poland || || || || 12-0
|-
! style=background:white colspan=9 |
|-
|-  bgcolor="#CCFFCC"
| 1987-12-? || Win ||align=left| Lajos Hugyetz || Full Contact Kickboxing World Cup '87, Final || Budapest, Hungary || || || || 11-0
|-
! style=background:white colspan=9 |
|-
|-  bgcolor="#CCFFCC"
| 1987-12-? || Win ||align=left| Stefan Lyung || Full Contact Kickboxing World Cup '87, Semi Finals || Budapest, Hungary || || || || 10-0
|-
|-  bgcolor="#CCFFCC"
| 1987-12-? || Win ||align=left| Pascal Bitafol || Full Contact Kickboxing World Cup '87, Quarter Finals || Budapest, Hungary || || || || 9-0
|-
|-  bgcolor="#CCFFCC"
| 1987-10-11 || Win ||align=left| Károly Halász || W.A.K.O. World Championships 1987, Full Contact Final -81 kg || Munich, West Germany || || || || 8-0
|-
! style=background:white colspan=9 |
|-
|-  bgcolor="#CCFFCC"
| 1987-10-11 || Win ||align=left| Sokrates Karaites || W.A.K.O. World Championships 1987, Full Contact Semi Final -81 kg || Munich, West Germany || || || || 7-0
|-
|-  bgcolor="#CCFFCC"
| 1987-10-11 || Win ||align=left| Rudy Smedley || W.A.K.O. World Championships 1987, Full Contact Quarter Final -81 kg || Munich, West Germany || || || || 6-0
|-
|-  bgcolor="#CCFFCC"
| 1987-10-11 || Win ||align=left| Gunter Singer || W.A.K.O. World Championships 1987, Full Contact 1st Round -81 kg || Munich, West Germany ||  || || || 5-0
|-
|-  bgcolor="#CCFFCC"
| || Win ||align=left| Andrzej First || || Kraków, Poland || || || || 4-0
|-
|-  bgcolor="#CCFFCC"
| || Win ||align=left| Andrew Zwycięstwto || || Kraków, Poland || || || || 3-0
|-
|-  bgcolor="#CCFFCC"
| || Win ||align=left| Cezary Nazar || || Warsaw, Poland || || || || 2-0
|-
|-  bgcolor="#CCFFCC"
| || Win ||align=left| Tomasz Pisowodzki || || Warsaw, Poland || || || || 1-0
|-
|-
| colspan=9 | Legend:

External links
Marek "The Punisher" Piotrowski short video

1964 births
Living people
Heavyweight boxers
Polish male kickboxers
Middleweight kickboxers
Light heavyweight kickboxers
Cruiserweight kickboxers
Heavyweight kickboxers
Polish male karateka
Kyokushin kaikan practitioners
People from Mińsk County
Polish expatriates in the United States
Sportspeople from Masovian Voivodeship
Polish male boxers